The 2001–02 FA Premier League (known as the FA Barclaycard Premiership for sponsorship reasons) was the tenth season of the competition. It began with a new sponsor, Barclaycard, and was titled the FA Barclaycard Premiership, replacing the previous sponsor, Carling. The title race turned into a battle among four sides – Arsenal, Manchester United, Liverpool and Newcastle United.

Arsenal clinched the title on 8 May 2002 after a convincing win against Manchester United at Old Trafford, in the penultimate game of the season. This new attacking Arsenal side had won the FA Cup five days before and made history by accomplishing their third double, their second under the reign of Arsène Wenger, who showed his commitment by signing a new four-year deal with Arsenal.

The season started on 18 August 2001 and ended on 11 May 2002.

Season summary
At the start of 2002 the title race was wide open, with the likes of Newcastle United and Leeds United contesting at the top of the table along with the usual likes of Arsenal and Manchester United. Newcastle, after back-to-back away wins at Arsenal and Leeds during the Christmas period, confirmed themselves as genuine title challengers and led the league at the turn of the year. Leeds had topped the table at Christmas prior to losing at Elland Road to Newcastle.

Despite being top of the table at the start of December – eleven points clear of Manchester United – Liverpool underwent a severe slump, falling to fifth place, five points behind United. Would-be contenders Chelsea, Newcastle United and Leeds United had by this point disappeared into the chasing pack.

January saw Liverpool travelling to both Highbury and Old Trafford in the space of a fortnight. Liverpool's Danny Murphy scored a late winner to give the Merseyside club all three points against United, and John Arne Riise then salvaged a point for Liverpool against Arsenal, allowing Manchester United to top the table for the first time that season.

In March, Arsenal were installed as strong favourites for the Premiership title after Liverpool's defeat to Tottenham Hotspur. Arsenal's April triumph against Bolton Wanderers brought them to within three points of a second Premier League title under Arsène Wenger.

Fittingly, the Premiership title would be decided at Old Trafford as Arsenal and Manchester United faced one another in a decisive encounter. Arsenal only required a draw to guarantee their second title in five seasons to go with their FA Cup victory against London rivals Chelsea four days previously; United had to win to take the title race to the last day. In the end, Arsenal emerged victorious as their record signing Sylvain Wiltord scored the only goal of the game as Arsenal was confirmed Premiership champions with a game to spare. Manchester United's disappointment was compounded by Liverpool leapfrogging them into second place by virtue of their 4–3 victory against Blackburn Rovers.

On the final day of the season Liverpool confirmed second place by trashing soon to be relegated Ipswich Town 5–0 at Anfield. Arsenal rounded off their successful league campaign in style, beating Everton 4–3 at Highbury. Manchester United limped to a poor draw against Charlton Athletic, completing a disappointing campaign for the deposed league champions.

For the first time in the history of the Premier League, all three promoted teams avoided relegation – Fulham, Bolton Wanderers and Blackburn Rovers. Blackburn Rovers and Bolton Wanderers avoided relegation until 2011–12, when the three promoted teams of 2010–11 coincidentally avoided relegation again, whilst Fulham avoided relegation until the 2013–14 season.

Fulham had splashed out £34 million on new players during the close season, with their owner Mohamed Al-Fayed being one of the wealthiest benefactors in English football. He even boasted that they would win the Premiership title in 2001–02, and most pundits tipped Fulham, managed by former French international Jean Tigana, to push for a place in Europe. However, Fulham finished thirteenth, 47 points away from Arsenal.

Bolton Wanderers went top of the Premiership after winning their first three fixtures of the season, causing an upset by beating Gérard Houllier's Liverpool in the latter stage of the game. Manager Sam Allardyce was boasting that his side were good enough to win their first ever league title, but Bolton's league form slumped after the first two months of the season and they finished 16th place – their survival confirmed in the penultimate game of the season.

Blackburn Rovers were the most successful of the promoted sides. Graeme Souness' men beat Tottenham Hotspur 2–1 in the League Cup final to lift the trophy for the first time, and then climbed from 18th place in the Premiership in late February to finish in a secure 10th place – higher than any other newly promoted team that season. Blackburn secured a UEFA Cup place for 2002–03.

Leicester City was the first team officially relegated from the Premiership, finishing bottom of table with just five Premiership wins in their last season at 111-year-old Filbert Street before relocation to the new 32 000-seat Walkers Stadium. The club went through the regime of two managers during the season – Peter Taylor was replaced by Dave Bassett in early October; six months later Bassett joined the club's board to be replaced by former assistant manager Micky Adams.

Just after the start of the 2002–03 season, Leicester's relegation (which cost them extensive television revenue) and the cost of their new stadium had created debts in excess of £30 million, and the club went into administration before being taken over by a new owner. Despite this setback, Leicester gained promotion back to the Premiership at the first time of asking, although they slipped back down again after just one season and Adams had since resigned to make way for new manager Craig Levein.

Next to go down were Derby County, who had been promoted alongside Leicester six years earlier. Manager Jim Smith resigned in early October to be replaced by assistant manager Colin Todd, who was sacked three months later after Derby were knocked out of the FA Cup by Division Three strugglers Bristol Rovers.

The last team to be relegated were Ipswich Town, who had qualified for the UEFA Cup and earned manager George Burley the Manager of the Year award the previous season after finishing fifth. Ipswich made a terrible start to the season, winning just one of their first 18 Premiership games. They then went on a strong run of form, winning seven out of eight games, which looked to have secured their Premiership survival, but they then suffered another setback which George Burley's men were unable to reverse, and their relegation was confirmed on the final day of the season by a 5–0 thrashing at Liverpool.

Teams
Twenty teams competed in the league – the top seventeen teams from the previous season and the three teams promoted from the First Division. The promoted teams were Fulham, Blackburn Rovers and Bolton Wanderers, returning after a top flight absence of thirty-three, two and three years respectively. This was also Fulham's first season in the Premier League. They replaced Manchester City, Coventry City and Bradford City, ending their one, thirty-four and two-year top flight spells respectively.

Stadiums and locations

Personnel and kits

 1 The Dreamcast logo appeared on Arsenal's home and third shirts while the Sega logo appeared on their away shirt

Managerial changes

League table

Results

Season statistics

Scoring

Top scorers

Hat-tricks 

Note: P Player scored a perfect hat-trick; (H) – Home; (A) – Away

Top assists

Awards

Monthly awards

Annual awards

See also
2001–02 in English football

References

External links
 2001–02 FA Premier League Season at RSSSF
2001/02 FA Premier League Review

 
Premier League seasons
Eng
1